Pedro Ponce de Cabrera (died 1248/1254), was a  magnate from the Kingdom of León, son of Ponce Vela de Cabrera and his wife Teresa Rodríguez Girón, daughter of Rodrigo Gutiérrez Girón and his first wife María de Guzmán.  From his marriage to Aldonza Alfonso de León, illegitimate daughter of Alfonso IX and his mistress Aldonza Martínez de Silva, «...would descend one of the most important and aristocratic Spanish families of the  Late Middle Ages, the Ponce de León, so relevant in the conquest of Andalusia where they were to receive over time the Marquisate of Cádiz and  Duchy of Arcos».

Biographical sketch 
Probably born near the end of the 12th century as he appears described in a document in July 1202 as a minor, Pedro Ponce de Cabrera was an important magnate during the reigns of King Alfonso IX,  whom he served as his alférez, and of his successor, Ferdinand III of Castile. In February 1221 he was part of the entourage that accompanied Infanta Eleanor of Castile, daughter of King Alfonso VIII of Castile, to  Ágreda for her wedding with King James I of Aragon.

He played an active role in the reconquista campaigns of King Fernando III in  Andalusia and fought against the moors in Seville, Lora del Río and Marchena. After the conquest of Córdoba in 1236, he was awarded land in the repartimiento while his son, also benefited a few years later, in 1248 from the partition and distribution of land after the conquest of Seville.

Pedro Ponce de Cabrera was buried in the chapel of Saint Benito at the Monastery of Santa María de Nogales, founded by his grandparents Vela Gutiérrez and Sancha Ponce de Cabrera.  His widow Aldonza was also buried in the same chapel.

Marriage and issue 
He married Aldonza Alfonso, illegitimate daughter of King Alfonso IX of León and his mistress Aldonza Martínez de Silva, sometime before 10 June 1230 when both appear together making a donation to the Monastery of Santa María de Nogales. On 7 October 1235 he executed a deed whereby he specified the arras to be received by his wife. They had the following children:

 Fernán Pérez Ponce de León (died in 1291 in Jerez de la Frontera), Lord of Puebla de Asturias, Cangas and Tineo, adelantado of the frontier of Andalusia, mayordomo mayor of King Alfonso X of Castile and ayo of Fernando IV of Castile. He and his wife Urraca Gutiérrez were buried in the main chapel of the church of the Monastery of Moreruela;
 Ruy Pérez Ponce de León (m. 1295), elected 15th Grand Master of the Order of Calatrava in 1284; 
 Juan Pérez Ponce de León, who benefited from the distribution of land after the conquest of Seville in 1248.
 Pedro Pérez Ponce de León (died c. 1280), comendador of the Order of Santiago;  
 Elvira Ponce de León
 Álvaro Ponce de León
 Juana Ponce de León

Notes

References

Bibliography 

  
 
 
 
 
 

 

12th-century births
1250s deaths
13th-century people from the Kingdom of León